Three Sisters (Tri sestry) is a 1994 Russian film, based on Anton Chekhov's 1901 play of the same name. The movie was very successful in the former countries of the USSR and had one Nika Award nomination for the best cinematographer.

Plot
In a small Russian town at the turn of the century, three sisters (Olga, Irina, and Masha) and their brother Andrei live but dream daily of their return to their former home in Moscow, where life is charming and stimulating meaningful. But for now they exist in a malaise of dissatisfaction. Soldiers from the local military post provide them some companionship and society, but nothing can suffice to replace Moscow in their hopes. Andrei marries a provincial girl, Natasha, and begins to settle into a life of much less meaning than he had hoped. Natasha begins to run the family her way. Masha, though married, yearns for the sophisticated life and begins a dalliance with Vershinin, an army officer with a sick and suicidal wife. Even Irina, the freshest, most optimistic of the sisters, begins to waver in her dreams until, finally, tragedy strikes.

Cast
Olga Belyayeva as Olga
Kseniya Kachalina as Irina
Elena Korikova as Masha
Sergei Agapitov as Andrei
Galina Dyomina   
Roman Falchenko  
Gennadi Ivanov
Stanislav Korolkov   
Mikhail Krylov
Maksim Masaltsev   
Mikhail Petukhov 
Dmitri Roshchin
Otto Sander as Vershinin 
Mariya Surova
Vitaliy Versace

Awards and nominations
 Nika Awards (1994)
The Best Cinematographer (Yuri Klimenko) - Nominated

External links

Russian drama films
1994 films
1990s Russian-language films
Films based on Three Sisters